Zasanie Synagogue, located in Przemyśl, Poland, was the only synagogue in Przemyśl built on the western bank of the San River. It served as a house of prayer for 30 years until the Second World War. Today it is one of the two remaining synagogue buildings in Przemyśl.  The other is the New Synagogue (Przemyśl).

History
The synagogue was built by the "Society for the Israelite House of Worship in Zasanie", Zasanie being the district of Przemyśl located on the western bank of the San River. Construction was started in 1892 and it was finally opened in 1909.

In 1939 when the area fell under Nazi occupation it was turned into a temporary power station. After the war the building was used as a garage, first for buses and then for ambulances.

In 1994 attempts were made to purchase the building and convert it into an art gallery and center for the artists of Przemyśl. The building would be named after a famous Przemyśl Jewish artist and include a permanent exhibit commemorating the contributions of the Jews of Przemyśl, their history and display photographs and accounts of the Holocaust. However, in 2005 it was bought by private local businessman Robert Błażkowski. Currently the building remains wrecked, closed and abandoned.

See also
 Old Synagogue (Przemyśl)
 New Synagogue (Przemyśl)
 Tempel Synagogue (Przemyśl)

References

External links

Photographs

Zasanie synagogue in Przemysl, 1999
Former Zasanie Synagogue, 2006

Synagogues in Przemyśl
Former synagogues in Poland
Holocaust locations in Poland